The 2013 Atlantic Coast Conference (ACC) football season was an NCAA football season that was played from August 29, 2013, to January 7, 2014. It was the first season of play for former Big East Conference members Pittsburgh and Syracuse. Syracuse plays in the Atlantic Division, while Pittsburgh plays in the Coastal Division. It was also the last season for Maryland in the ACC as they will move to the Big Ten Conference in 2014.

The Atlantic Coast Conference consists of 14 members in two divisions. The Atlantic division consists of Boston College, Clemson, Florida State, Maryland, North Carolina State, Syracuse, and Wake Forest. The Coastal division consists of Duke, Georgia Tech, Miami, North Carolina, Pittsburgh, Virginia, and Virginia Tech. The division champions, Duke and Florida State, met in December in the 2013 ACC Championship Game, located in Charlotte, North Carolina at Bank of America Stadium.

Preseason

Preseason Poll
The 2013 ACC Preseason Poll was announced at the ACC Football Kickoff meetings in Greensboro, NC on July 22. Miami was voted to win Coastal division while Clemson was voted to win the Atlantic division and the conference. Tajh Boyd of Clemson was voted the Preseason ACC Player of the Year.

Atlantic Division poll
 Clemson – 815 (102 first place votes)
 Florida State – 731 (18)
 North Carolina State – 490
 Wake Forest – 392
 Maryland – 373
 Syracuse - 320
 Boston College – 211

Coastal Division poll
 Miami – 736 (65)
 Virginia Tech – 654 (27)
 North Carolina – 649 (22)
 Georgia Tech – 522 (6)
 Pittsburgh - 313
 Virginia – 230
 Duke – 228

Predicted ACC Championship Game Winner
 Clemson – 95
 Florida State – 15
 Georgia Tech – 3
 Miami – 3
 North Carolina - 3
 Virginia Tech - 1

Preseason ACC Player of the Year
 Tajh Boyd, CLEM - 105
 Duke Johnson, MIA - 4
 Logan Thomas, VT - 3
 Sammy Watkins, CLEM - 3
 Bryn Renner, UNC - 2
 Jeremiah Attaochu, GT - 1
 Lamarcus Joyner, FSU - 1
 Stephen Morris, MIA - 1

Preseason All Conference Teams

Offense

Defense

Specialist

Coaches
Three universities hired new coaches for the 2013 football season.  NC State hired Dave Doeren from Northern Illinois after he led the Huskies to back-to-back MAC championships.  With this hire, Doeren was made the second highest paid coach in the ACC (behind Florida State's Jimbo Fisher) and the 27th highest paid coach in the country. Boston College also changed coaches, hiring Steve Addazio from Temple.  Addazio had only been a head coach for 2 years, however, Boston College athletic director Brad Bates stated that he has had Addazio on his short list of coaches for years.  Syracuse promoted their defensive coordinator, Scott Shafer, of the previous 4 years to head coach after their previous head coach, Doug Marrone, left for a job coaching the Buffalo Bills of the NFL.  They will join Paul Chryst of Pittsburgh (due to conference realignment) as new coaches in the ACC.

NOTE: Stats shown are before the beginning of the season

Rankings

Bowl Games

Postseason

All-conference teams

First Team

Offense

Defense

Second Team

Offense

Defense

Third Team

Offense

Defense

ACC Individual Awards

ACC Player of the Year
QB Jameis Winston - Florida State

Rookie of the Year
QB Jameis Winston - Florida State

Coach of the Year
David Cutcliffe - Duke

Offensive Player of the Year
QB Jameis Winston - Florida State

Offensive Rookie of the Year
QB Jameis Winston - Florida State

Brian Piccolo Award
RB Robert Godhigh - Georgia Tech

Jacobs Blocking Trophy
T Cameron Erving - Florida State

Defensive Player of the Year
DT Aaron Donald - Pittsburgh

Defensive Rookie of the Year
CB Kendall Fuller - Virginia Tech

Jim Tatum Award
T Perry Simmons - Duke

National Awards

Outland Trophy
DT Aaron Donald- Pittsburgh

Lombardi Award
DT Aaron Donald - Pittsburgh

Nagurski Trophy
DT Aaron Donald - Pittsburgh

Bednarik Award
DT Aaron Donald - Pittsburgh

Doak Walker Award
RB Andre Williams- Boston College

Lou Groza Award
PK Roberto Aguayo - Florida State

Rimington Trophy
C Bryan Stork - Florida State

Walter Camp Coach of the Year Award
David Cutcliffe - Duke

Heisman Trophy
QB Jameis Winston- Florida State

Walter Camp Award
QB Jameis Winston - Florida State

Davey O'Brien Award
QB Jameis Winston - Florida State

2014 NFL Draft

N.B: In the explanations below, (D) denotes trades that took place during the 2014 Draft, while (PD) indicates trades completed pre-draft.

Round one

Round two

Round three

Round four

Round five

Round six

Round seven

Trade references

References